Iya may refer to:

People
 Iya Abubakar, Nigerian politician
 Iya Arepina, Russian actress
 Iya Kiva (b. 1984), Ukrainian poet, translator, journalist, critic
 Iya Nacuaa Teyusi Ñaña, Mixtec ruler
 Iya Savvina, Soviet actress
 Iya Villania, Australian actress

Places
 Iya, Iran, a village in East Azerbaijan Province, Iran
 Mount Iya, volcano in Indonesia
 Iya (river), river in Irkutsk Oblast in Russia
 Iya Station, railway station in Japan
 Iya Valley, valley in Japan

Other uses
 Iya (mythology) in Lakota mythology
 Iyayu language, ISO 639-3 code "iya"
 Iya the term in the Edo language for the Walls of Benin

IYA may refer to:
 International Year of Astronomy (IYA2009)